Infrastructure Development Company Limited  is a government owned specialised non-bank financial institution that finances renewable infrastructure projects  in Bangladesh and is located in  Dhaka, Bangladesh. 
In 2016, it was awarded the United Nations Momentum for Change Award.

History
Infrastructure Development Company Limited was established on 14 May 1997 by the Government of Bangladesh. It also finances organizations who distribute solar panels in Bangladesh. The company was licensed by the Bangladesh Bank as a non-bank financial institution (NBFI) on 5 January 1998. Since its inception, IDCOL is playing a major role in bridging the financing gap for developing medium to large-scale infrastructure and renewable energy projects in Bangladesh.

IDCOL is managed by a nine-member independent Board of Directors comprising five senior government officials, three representatives from the private sector and a full-time executive director and chief executive officer. Secretary/Senior Secretary of Economic Relations Division (ERD) under Ministry of Finance is the ex-officio chairman of the company. It has a small and multi-skilled work force comprising financial and market analysts, engineers, lawyers, IT experts, accountants and environmental and social safeguard specialists.

References

Government-owned companies of Bangladesh
Infrastructure in Bangladesh
Companies based in Dhaka
Bangladeshi companies established in 1997